Egypt competed at the 1984 Summer Olympics in Los Angeles, United States.  The nation returned to the Summer Games after participating in the African boycott of the 1976 Summer Olympics in Montreal and the American-led boycott of the 1980 Summer Olympics in Moscow. 114 competitors, 108 men and 6 women, took part in 74 events in 15 sports.

Medalists

Athletics

Men's 400 metres
 Nafee Mersal
 Heat — 46.46 (→ did not advance)

Men's Shot Put
 Ahmed Kamel Shatta
 Qualifying Round — 18.58 m (→ did not advance)
 Ahmed Mohamed Achouche
 Qualifying Round — 18.11 m (→ did not advance)

Basketball

Men's Team Competition
Preliminary Round (Group A)
 Lost to Italy (62-110)
 Lost to Brazil (82-91)
 Lost to Yugoslavia (69-100)
 Lost to West-Germany (58-85)
 Lost to Australia (78-94)
Classification Matches
 9th/12th place: Lost to PR China (73-76)
 11th/12th place: Lost to France (78-102) → Twelfth and last place
Team Roster
Khaled Bekhit
Mohamed Khaled 
Alain Attalah
Mohamady Soliman
Abdelkader Rabieh 
Amr Abdelmeguid
Abdelhadi El-Gazzar 
Amin Shouman
Medhat Warda
Tarek El-Sabbagh 
Ahmed Marei
Essameldin Abouelnein

Boxing

Men's Bantamweight (54 kg)
Gamaleldin El-Koumy
 First Round — Bye
 Second Round — Lost to Hiroaki Takami (Japan), 1-4

Diving

Men's 3m Springboard
Said Daw
 Preliminary Round — 407.88 (→ did not advance, 26th place)
Tamer Farid
 Preliminary Round — 373.71 (→ did not advance, 28th place)

Fencing

Six fencers, all men, represented Egypt in 1984.

Men's foil
 Abdel Monem El-Husseini
 Bilal Rifaat
 Ahmed Diab

Men's team foil
 Ahmed Diab, Abdel Monem El-Husseini, Bilal Rifaat, Khaled Soliman

Men's épée
 Ihab Aly
 Khaled Soliman
 Abdel Monem Salem

Men's team épée
 Ihab Aly, Ahmed Diab, Abdel Monem Salem, Khaled Soliman

Football

Men's Team Competition
 Preliminary Round (Group D)
 Egypt – Italy 0 – 1
 Egypt – Costa Rica 4 – 1
 Egypt – United States 1 – 1
 Quarterfinals
 Egypt – France 0 – 2 (→ Did not advance)
Team Roster:
 ( 1.) Adel Elmaamour
 ( 2.) Ali El Sayed Gadallah
 ( 3.) Rabie Yassin
 ( 4.) Mahmoud Saleh Hisham
 ( 5.) Ibrahim Youssif
 ( 6.) Yehia Sedky 
 ( 7.) Mostafa Ismail
 ( 8.) Shawki Gharib 
 ( 9.) Magdi Abdelghani
 (10.) Mahmoud El Khatib 
 (11.) Emad Soleman
 (12.) Taher Abouzied
 (13.) Badreldin Hamed
 (14.) Mohamed Helmi
 (15.) Omar Elzeer
 (16.) Alaa Morsy
 (17.) Salem Nagui Ahmed

Modern pentathlon

Three male pentathletes represented Egypt in 1984.

Individual
 Ihab El-Lebedy
 Samy Awad
 Ahmed Nasser

Test
 Ihab El-Lebedy
 Samy Awad
 Ahmed Nasser

Sailing

Shooting

Swimming

Men's 100m Freestyle 
Mohamed Youssef
 Heat — 53.19 (→ did not advance, 34th place)
Ahmed Said
 Heat — 55.01 (→ did not advance, 50th place)

Men's 200m Freestyle
 Mohamed Youssef
 Heat — 1:59.71 (→ did not advance, 44th place)

Men's 100m Backstroke 
Sharif Nour
 Heat — 59.63 (→ did not advance, 26th place)
Emad El-Shafei
 Heat — 1:02.04 (→ did not advance, 33rd place)

Men's 200m Backstroke 
Emad El-Shafei
 Heat — 2:12.90 (→ did not advance, 29th place)

Men's 100m Breaststroke
Ayman Nadim
 Heat — 1:09.51 (→ did not advance, 43rd place)

Men's 200m Breaststroke 
Ayman Nadim
 Heat — 2:33.17 (→ did not advance, 39th place)

Men's 100m Butterfly
Ahmed Said
 Heat — 57.71 (→ did not advance, 34th place)
Ahmed Eid
 Heat — 58.95 (→ did not advance, 40th place)

Men's 200m Butterfly
Mohamed Youssef
 Heat — 2:08.88 (→ did not advance, 30th place)
Ahmed Said
 Heat — DNS (→ did not advance, no ranking)

Men's 200m Individual Medley
Emad El-Shafei
 Heat — 2:14.87 (→ did not advance, 30th place)

Men's 4 × 100 m Freestyle Relay 
Mohamed Youssef, Sharif Nour, Ahmed Eid, and Ahmed Said
 Heat — DSQ (→ did not advance, no ranking)

Men's 4 × 100 m Medley Relay
Sharif Nour, Ayman Nadim, Ahmed Said, and Mohamed Youssef
 Heat — 3:59.31 (→ did not advance, 15th place)

Women's 100m Freestyle
Sherwite Hafez
 Heat — 1:02.78 (→ did not advance, 40th place)
Nevine Hafez
 Heat — 1:04.06 (→ did not advance, 42nd place)

Women's 200m Freestyle
Sherwite Hafez
 Heat — 2:16.11 (→ did not advance, 33rd place)

Women's 200m Butterfly
Nevine Hafez
 Heat — DNS (→ did not advance, no ranking)

Synchronized swimming

Women's Solo
 Dahlia Mokbel
 Figures - 73.367 (44th place)
 Final Standing - 155.767 (16th place)
 Sahar Helal
 Figures - 70.049 (did not advance, 45th place)
 Sahar Youssef
 Figures - 67.165 (did not advance, 48th place)

Women's Duet
 Dahlia Mokbel and Sahar Youssef
 Figures - 67.165
 Final Standing - Unknown Score (17th place)

Volleyball

Men's team competition
Preliminary Round (Group B)
 Lost to Canada (0-3)
 Lost to China (0-3)
 Lost to Japan (0-3)
 Lost to Italy (0-3)
Classification match
 9th/10th place: Lost to Tunisia (2-3) → 10th place
Team roster
 Khaled Abdel Rahman
 Mahmoud Abouelelaa
 Ahmed Elaskalani
 Esam Awad
 Essam Ramadan
 Gaber Abouzeid 
 Shaaban Khalifa
 Hesham Radwan 
 Ahmed El-Shamouty
 Abdelhamed El-Wassimy
 Mohamed Abdel Hamed
 Ehab Mohamed

Weightlifting

Wrestling

Kamal Ibrahim, Men's Light-Heavyweight wrestler

References

External links
 Official Report

Nations at the 1984 Summer Olympics
1984
1984 in Egyptian sport